The following is a list of pipeline accidents in the United States in 1987. It is one of several lists of U.S. pipeline accidents. See also: list of natural gas and oil production accidents in the United States.

Incidents 

This is not a complete list of all pipeline accidents. For natural gas alone, the Pipeline and Hazardous Materials Safety Administration (PHMSA), a United States Department of Transportation agency, has collected data on more than 3,200 accidents deemed serious or significant since 1987.

A "significant incident" results in any of the following consequences:
 Fatality or injury requiring in-patient hospitalization.
 $50,000 or more in total costs, measured in 1984 dollars.
 Liquid releases of five or more barrels (42 US gal/barrel).
 Releases resulting in an unintentional fire or explosion.

PHMSA and the National Transportation Safety Board (NTSB) post-incident data and results of investigations into accidents involving pipelines that carry a variety of products, including natural gas, oil, diesel fuel, gasoline, kerosene, jet fuel, carbon dioxide, and other substances. Occasionally pipelines are re-purposed to carry different products.

The following incidents occurred during 1987:
 1987 On January 30, natural gas leaking from a pipeline under repair in Colorado Springs, Colorado, ignited, sending flames 45 feet into the air, and injuring four people.
 1987 A petroleum pipeline ruptured and burned, near Corsicana, Texas on March 12, forcing the closure of an Interstate highway, and causing some evacuations.
 1987 A work crew burning the remains of a house near Ladysmith, Virginia ruptured a nearby petroleum products pipeline with a bulldozer on March 26, igniting diesel fuel from the line. 2 of the workers were injured.
 1987 On April 4, an LPG pipeline exploded at a Terminal in Iowa City, Iowa. Due to the fire spreading to a pipeline for nearby underground gas storage, residents within a 2 1/2 mile radius of the Terminal were evacuated for a time. The fire burned until April 20. The cause was an ERW seam failure in a pipeline. During a hydrostatic test of that pipeline, 20 more pipeline segment seams failed.
 1987 In Odessa, Texas, on April 18, a crude oil pipeline burst into flames, destroying nine mobile homes and two cars. The fire started under a mobile home on Andrews Highway. The Texas Railroad Commission stated that gases within the crude corroded and weakened the 10-inch 60-year-old pipe. When the line split, it spewed oil into the fire, fueling the blaze and causing dense black smoke that choked firefighters and bystanders.
 1987 A Mobil pipeline ruptured near Lebec, California on June 8, spilling about 2,500 barrels of crude oil. The failure was from external corrosion of the pipeline. 
 1987 On June 11, a "rock ripper" at a construction site punctured a 32-inch Colonial Pipeline petroleum products pipeline in Centreville, Virginia. Gasoline sprayed from the rupture, but there was no fire. Thirteen emergency response personnel suffered from exposure to the gasoline fumes.
 1987 An Amoco pipeline failed in Florence, Michigan on June 11, spilling 24,000 barrels of petroleum.
 1987 On June 12, a petroleum products pipeline ruptured near Harwood, North Dakota. 289 barrels of fuel oil were spilled. There were no injuries. Investigation showed this pipeline failed at a low frequency Electric Resistance Welding (ERW) seam. Further testing after this accident lead to 5 other LF-ERW failures along this pipeline in Minnesota and North Dakota. 
 1987 Construction equipment hit a LPG/NGL pipeline near Rochester, Iowa on June 26, killing one person, and injuring 2 others.
 1987 On July 3, a Yellowstone Pipeline Company line failed from an unspecified flaw in the pipe, in Montana. About 162,000 gallons of petroleum product were lost.
 1987 On July 24, a fishing vessel, working in shallow waters off of Empire, Louisiana, the Fishing vessel Sea Chief, struck and ruptured an 8" natural gas liquids pipeline operating at 480 psi. The resulting explosion killed two crew members. Divers investigating found that the pipe, installed in 1968, was covered with only 6" of soft mud, having lost its original  cover of sediments.
 1987 On July 23, a construction crew working on an Interstate 90 project east of Coeur d'Alene, Idaho struck the 10-inch diameter Yellowstone Pipeline, causing a leak that sprayed out over 27,000 gallons of gasoline. The pipeline was supposed to have 30 inches of soil cover, but had only 2 inches of cover. There was no fire.
 1987 On August 5, a gas leak on a busy road in Wilmington, North Carolina suddenly ignited, while gas company workers were trying to plug that leak, burning them and firefighters on standby. 19 people were burned, with a Fire Department Assistant Chief later dying from the burns he received.
 1987 On September 9, 3 pipeline workers were hurt, when a 6 inch butane pipeline they were working on exploded, near Kemah, Texas.
 1987 4 pipeline workers were hurt while working on a Columbia Gas Transmission pipeline in Martin, Kentucky on October 19. A rubber seal inside a steel collar failed, allowing 2 sections of pipeline to separate. There was no fire.

References

Lists of pipeline accidents in the United States